Vice Admiral Sir Michael Frampton Fell,  (17 January 1918 – 3 December 1976) was a Royal Navy officer who served as Flag Officer, Carriers from 1968 to 1970.

Early life and education
Fell was born in Calcutta, British India, the younger son of Herbert Leigh Fell and Winifred Adeline Fell. He was educated at Harrow School.

Naval career
Fell joined the Royal Navy as a midshipman in July 1938. After qualifying as a pilot, he became commanding officer of 805 Naval Air Squadron in the Western Desert in late 1941 during the Second World War. He went on to command 878 Naval Air Squadron in Sicily from early 1943 before becoming air commander on the aircraft carrier , in which role he led the attacks on the German battleship Tirpitz as part of the Home Fleet Strike force of Operation Tungsten, and then became air commander on the aircraft carrier .

Fell next served as air commander on the aircraft carrier  during the Korean War. He went on to be commanding officer of the frigate  in 1957, station commander of RNAS Lossiemouth in 1958 and commanding officer of the frigate  in 1961. After that he became chief of staff to the Commander-in-Chief, Portsmouth in 1963, commanding officer of the aircraft carrier  in 1965 and Flag Officer, Gibraltar in 1966. His final appointments were as Flag Officer, Carriers in 1968, as Flag Officer Naval Air Command in 1970 and as chief of staff to the Commander Allied Naval Forces Southern Europe in 1972 before retiring in 1974.

Personal life
In 1948, Fell married Elise "Elsie" Joan McLauchlan-Slater.

Fell collapsed and died at the wheel of his car on 3 December 1976, near his home at Stoughton, West Sussex. Lady Fell died on 2 March 2015.

References

1918 births
1976 deaths
People educated at Harrow School
Companions of the Distinguished Service Order
Fleet Air Arm aviators
Recipients of the Commendation for Valuable Service in the Air
Knights Commander of the Order of the Bath
Recipients of the Distinguished Service Cross (United Kingdom)
Royal Navy vice admirals
Royal Navy officers of World War II
Royal Navy personnel of the Korean War
Fleet Air Arm personnel of World War II
People from Stoughton, West Sussex
British people in colonial India
Military personnel of British India